Qaleh Bardi (also Romanized as Qal‘eh Bardī and Ghal‘eh Bardi; also known as Qalāvardīn and Qalāvardīr) is a village in Pachehlak-e Sharqi Rural District, in the Central District of Aligudarz County, Lorestan Province, Iran. At the 2006 census, its population was 210, in 39 families.

References 

Towns and villages in Aligudarz County